The following lists events that happened in 2010 in Iceland.

Incumbents
President – Ólafur Ragnar Grímsson 
Prime Minister – Jóhanna Sigurðardóttir

Events

January
 January 2 - A quarter of voters in Iceland sign a petition asking President Ólafur Ragnar Grímsson to veto a bill on repaying US$5 billion to foreign savers who lost their money when Icelandic banks collapsed.
 January 5 - President Ólafur Ragnar Grímsson announces a referendum during a live televised speech.

March
 March 6 - Iceland holds a referendum about compensating the United Kingdom and the Netherlands after the collapse of the Icesave bank, with a 95% "no" vote recorded.
 March 20 - The volcano, Eyjafjallajökull, erupts starting mass destruction in Europe.

April

 April 13 - An American Boeing 767 passenger jet makes an emergency landing in Iceland after reports of chemical fumes in the cabin. A spokesman for Keflavik airport outside Reykjavík says several crew members on the American Airlines flight had complained of dizziness.
 April 14 - Air traffic is closed over Northern Norway as ash cloud from the Eyjafjallajökull volcano drifts towards Europe.

References

 
2010s in Iceland
Iceland
Iceland
Years of the 21st century in Iceland